20th Avenue may refer to:

20th Avenue (Brooklyn), a street in Brooklyn, New York
20th Avenue (BMT Sea Beach Line), subway station serving the 
20th Avenue (BMT West End Line), subway station serving the